Index of Washington-related articles may refer to:

 Index of Washington (state)-related articles
 Index of Washington, D.C.-related articles